Bullets and Saddles is a 1943 American Western film produced by Monogram Pictures Corporation shot at Corriganville. The film is the twenty-fourth and final entry in Monogram Pictures' "Range Busters" series, and it stars Ray "Crash" Corrigan as Dusty, Dennis Moore as Denny and Max Terhune as Alibi, with Julie Duncan, Budd Buster and Rose Plumer. Bullets and Saddles uses footage from Fugitive Valley, another film in the series.

Plot

A crooked businessman tries to get control of an area with his gang. The Range Busters are called in to try to stop his plan.

Cast
 Ray Corrigan as Ray "Crash" Corrigan
 Dennis Moore as Denny Moore
 Max Terhune as Max "Alibi" Terhune
 Julie Duncan as Laura Craig
 Budd Buster as Charley Craig
 Rose Plumer as Mother Craig
 Forrest Taylor as Marshal Claiburn
 Glenn Strange as Jack Hammond

See also
The Range Busters series:

 The Range Busters (1940)
 Trailing Double Trouble (1940)
 West of Pinto Basin (1940)
 Trail of the Silver Spurs (1941)
 The Kid's Last Ride (1941)
 Tumbledown Ranch in Arizona (1941)
 Wrangler's Roost (1941)
 Fugitive Valley (1941)
 Saddle Mountain Roundup (1941)
 Tonto Basin Outlaws (1941)
 Underground Rustlers (1941)
 Thunder River Feud (1942)
 Rock River Renegades (1942)
 Boot Hill Bandits (1942)
 Texas Trouble Shooters (1942)
 Arizona Stage Coach (1942)
 Texas to Bataan (1942)
 Trail Riders (1942)
 Two Fisted Justice (1943)
 Haunted Ranch (1943)
 Land of Hunted Men (1943)
 Cowboy Commandos (1943)
 Black Market Rustlers (1943)
 Bullets and Saddles (1943)

References

External links

Bullets and Saddles film on Internet Archive

1943 films
1943 Western (genre) films
American Western (genre) films
American black-and-white films
Range Busters
1940s American films